1789 in sports describes the year's events in world sport.

Boxing
Events
 11 February — Tom Johnson retained his English championship with a victory over Michael Ryan at Rickmansworth in 12 round 33 minute fight.
 September — Tom Johnson was scheduled to fight "Big" Ben Brain but it was not held because Brain was ill.
 22 October or 22 November, depending on source — Tom Johnson retained his English championship with a victory over Isaac Perrins at Banbury in the 62nd round of a fight lasting one hour 15 minutes.
 23 October — "Big" Ben Brain defeated Jack Jacombs at Banbury in a 1 hour 25 minute to 1 hour 26 minute 36th round fight.
 18 December — "Big" Ben Brain defeated Tom Tring in a 19 minute 12th round fight at Dartford.

Cricket
Events
 John Sackville, 3rd Duke of Dorset, organised an international tour of English cricketers to France, but it was abandoned following the outbreak of the French Revolution
England
 Most runs – Billy Beldham 306
 Most wickets – Robert Clifford 39

Horse racing
England
 The Derby – Skyscraper
 The Oaks – Tag
 St Leger Stakes – Pewett

References

 
Sports by year